Security of tenure, leaving a judge free from improper influence resulting from an unjustified threat of removal, is generally said to be an important feature of judicial independence in Australia. The emergence of responsible government in the Australian colonies in the 19th century saw the emergence of judicial independence, such that by Federation in 1901, federal judges and supreme court judges accused of judicial misconduct could, generally, only be removed from office as a result of an address passed by the relevant houses of parliament.

References

Security

Judicial misconduct